The men's 5000 metres  event at the 1936 Olympic Games took place August 4 and August 7.  The final was won by Finn Gunnar Höckert in Olympic record time.

Results

Heats

The fastest five runners in each of the three heats advanced to the final round.

Heat one

Heat two

Heat three

Final

Key: DNF = Did not finish, OR = Olympic record

References

Athletics at the 1936 Summer Olympics
5000 metres at the Olympics
Men's events at the 1936 Summer Olympics